This is a discography of The Planets, Op. 32, an orchestral suite by Gustav Holst, written between 1914 and 1916, and first performed by the Queen's Hall Orchestra conducted by Adrian Boult on 29 September 1918. It includes the composer's own recordings made in 1922-23 and 1926.

Orchestral version

Concert Band version

Two-piano transcription

Other versions

References

Discographies of classical compositions
Compositions by Gustav Holst